Las Arenas is one of nine Parish in Cabrales, a municipality within the province and autonomous community of Asturias, in northern Spain. 

Villages
 Arangas 
 Las Arenas

References

Parishes in Cabrales